Yanranay (Janraňaj) is a rural locality (a selo) in Chaunsky District of Chukotka Autonomous Okrug, Russia, located just to the west of Pevek. Population:  Municipally, Yanranay is subordinated to Chaunsky Municipal District and is incorporated as Yanranay Rural Settlement.

History
Yanranay was founded in 1954 or 1960 when several formerly nomadic enterprises were grouped together to form kolkhozes (collective farms). The Chukchi who live here originally came from Cape Shelag, to the north. Modern Yanranay is a typical ethnic Chukotkan village, consisting of one- or two-story houses, with basic facilities including a school, stores, a library, and a House of Culture. The name for the village translates from the Chukchi as "Solitary Mountain" as the settlement is at the foot of a mountain of the same name.

Change in municipal status
Prior to October 2010, Yanranay served as the administrative center of Yanranay Rural Settlement—a municipal division of Chaunsky Municipal District. On October 20, 2010, Yanranay Rural Settlement was abolished with its territory merged into Pevek Urban Settlement. As an inhabited locality, however, the status of Yanranay remains unchanged.

Demographics
The population according to the 2010 census was 217, of whom 113 were male and 104 female. According to the official Chaunsky District website was estimated at 209, down slightly from 226 in 2005 according to an environmental impact report produced for the Kupol Gold Project, which itself was down slightly on a 2003 estimate of 240, most of whom are of Chukchi descent.

Transportation
Yanranay is only connected by a  dirt road to Pevek, with a journey time of 40–50 minutes.

Climate

See also
List of inhabited localities in Chaunsky District

References

Notes

Sources
Bema Gold Corporation, Environmental Impact Assessment, Kupol Gold Project, Far East Russia June 2005.

 
 
M Strogoff, P-C Brochet, and D. Auzias Petit Futé: Chukotka (2006). "Avant-Garde" Publishing House.

Rural localities in Chukotka Autonomous Okrug
Populated places of Arctic Russia